The King's Surrender is a 2014 German thriller film directed by Philipp Leinemann.

Cast 
 Ronald Zehrfeld - Kevin
 Mišel Matičević - Mendes
 Thomas Thieme - Harthmann
  - Willmund
  - Brandes
  - Thorsten
 Frederick Lau - Jacek

References

External links 

2014 thriller films
German thriller films
2010s German films
2010s German-language films